The 2016 London ePrix (formally the 2016 FIA Formula E Visa London ePrix) were two Formula E motor races that took place on the 2 and 3 July 2016 on the Battersea Park Street Circuit in Battersea Park, London. They were the ninth and tenth rounds of the 2015–16 Formula E season, the last of the second season of Formula E. They were also the 20th and 21st Formula E races overall and this was the second edition of the London ePrix. Prior to the race it was announced by Formula E that the races would not take place in Battersea Park in future years and that a street circuit location would be sought. This followed a High Court challenge to the race taking place in a public park and the way that Wandsworth Council had acted to continue the races despite opposition from park users. The court case against the Council was withdrawn after an agreement was reached between the claimant and Formula E that the 2016 race would be the last. For the 2019–20 season, the race was due to return, but at ExCeL London, however the race was cancelled in response to the COVID-19 pandemic. It eventually returned on the 2020–21 season.

Race One

Qualifying results 

Notes

- Stéphane Sarrazin, Ma Qing Hua and Nelson Piquet Jr. were handed grid penalties due to mechanical changes.

- Simona de Silvestro did not set a full power lap.

Race results 

Notes
 – Three points for pole position.
 – Two points for fastest lap.
 - Nick Heidfeld received a drive through penalty converted into a 50-seconds time penalty for using the fanboost twice.
 - Simona de Silvestro received a drive through penalty converted into a 50-seconds time penalty for exceeding the maximum energy.

Race Two

Qualifying results

Race results 

Notes
 – Three points for pole position.
 – Two points for fastest lap.
 - Nick Heidfeld, Jean-Éric Vergne and António Félix da Costa received a drive through penalty converted into a 50-seconds time penalty for exceeding the maximum energy.
 - Jean-Éric Vergne received a 1-second time penalty for an unsafe release.
 - António Félix da Costa received a drive through penalty converted into a 50-seconds time penalty for driving off the track.

References 

|- style="text-align:center"
|width="35%"|Previous race:2016 Berlin ePrix
|width="30%"|FIA Formula E Championship2015–16 season
|width="35%"|Next race:2016 Hong Kong ePrix
|- style="text-align:center"
|width="35%"|Previous race:2015 London ePrix
|width="30%"|London ePrix
|width="35%"|Next race:2021 London ePrix
|- style="text-align:center"

London ePrix
London ePrix
London ePrix
London ePrix
ePrix